Chung Hae-soung (Korean: 정해성, Hanja : 鄭海成, born March 4, 1958, in Busan, South Korea) is a South Korean football manager and former player. He is the manager of Hồ Chí Minh City.

Club career 
 1984-1989 Lucky-Goldstar FC (Currently FC Seoul)

Managerial career 
In 1989, Chung ended his career and started managerial career.

From 1990 to 1998, He led the team such as LG Cheetahs, Pohang Atoms and Jeonnam Dragons FC as assistant coach.

In 2000, he led the 'Sydney Olympic Korean National Team' as Chief Assistant Coach. And, He was -Assistant Coach of Hiddink’s Korea national team with Park Hang-seo in 2002 Korea-Japan World Cup. Mr. Park and Mr. Chung are same age and together support Hiddink.

In 2003, he debuted as a manager of Bucheon SK (Currently Jeju United FC). His team was second place in 2004 FA cup, 4th place in 2005 K league and semi-final places in 2007 FA cup.

In 2008, he moved to Korea National team as a Chief Assistant Coach. With Huh Jung-moo, He led the team to Round of 16 in 2010 South Africa World Cup.

After that, he was appointed as Jeonnam Dragons FC manager to replace Park Hang-seo. The team recorded the smallest lose a goal in the 2011 season.

Since 2014, he has taken charge of outside director of Korea Football Association. When Korea national team faced big problem their situation in 2017, he was picked as a fire fighter (Chief Assistant Coach).

But, he resigned by himself for next coaching generation (Current Shin tae Yong).

When Korea national team faced big problem their situation in 2017, he was mentioned for the manager of Korea National Team with Huh jung moo, Shin tae yong.(Who could be the next manager of KNT?)

His philosophy is "There are no player above the team" and he is the type of research man and he exactly knows that how to make one team. He knows that manner and attitude to Media and public as a man who are loved by KFA.

Coach & Manager Career List 
 1990-1994 LG Cheetahs (assistant coach)
 1995 Pohang Atoms (assistant coach)
 1996-1998 Jeonnam Dragons (assistant coach)
 1999-2000 South Korea U-23 (Chief Assistant Coach)
 2000-2002 South Korea (Assistant Coach with Hiddink with Park Hang-seo)
 2003-2007 Bucheon SK / Jeju United FC (manager)
 2008-2010 South Korea (Chief Assistant Coach)
 2010-2012 Jeonnam Dragons (manager)
 2017 Chung-Ang High School (Technical Director)
 2017 South Korea (Chief Assistant Coach)
 2017-2018 Hoang Anh Gia Lai (Technical Director)
 2019–2020 Hồ Chí Minh City (manager)

Licenses 
 P License by Asian Football confederation
 A License by Korean Football Association
 B License by Korean Football confederation
 Germany FC Schalke 04 & F.C. Hansa Rostock Coaching School

Photo 
https://search.naver.com/search.naver?where=image&sm=tab_jum&query=%EC%A0%95%ED%95%B4%EC%84%B1

Club career statistics

References

External links
 

1958 births
Living people
Association football defenders
South Korean footballers
South Korean football managers
K League 1 players
FC Seoul players
FC Seoul non-playing staff
Jeju United FC managers
Jeonnam Dragons managers
Sportspeople from Busan